The term Celtic astrology may refer to
Various systems of astrology invented by enthusiasts of Robert Graves Celtic Tree Alphabet, (ogham), see Celtic Astrology (Graves)
hypothetical astrological systems of the prehistoric Celts, see Celtic calendar